Steve Le Marquand (born 26 December 1967) is an Australian-born actor, known both locally and internationally for his film and stage work.

Personal life 
Born in Perth, Western Australia in 1967, his family moved to Sydney when he was quite young.

His younger sister is the columnist and media commentator Sarrah Le Marquand.

He is married to Australian actress and singer Pippa Grandison and they have a child together, Charlie.

He is commonly referred to by his nickname, Slem (his initials).

He played cricket for a number of years for many different teams and was also selected for various representative teams. His top score was 116* and best bowling figures of 8/9.

Lives in Lake Clifton in rural WA.

Career 
Prior to acting, Le Marquand motorcycled his way around Australia, working on various cattle stations, docks, pubs, barges and melon farms. He then studied performing arts at Penrith in Sydney's outer west at the University of Western Sydney (Theatre Nepean) before stumbling across an agent in Penny Williams in 1992.

His first job was a TV commercial for Arnott's Ruffles which was banned a day after its release for sacrilege. His second job was on the Australian TV series Police Rescue and since then he has played an assortment of thugs, baddies, larrikins and cops (both good and bad) in a number of TV shows, including Les Norton, Australia's Sexiest Tradie, Janet King; Underbelly: Razor, Rake, Laid, All Saints, Farscape, Crash Palace, Young Lions, Blue Heelers, Water Rats, Big Sky, G.P., Murder Call, Home and Away, Wildside, and the ABC mini-series A Difficult Woman. He played the lead role of Tony Piccolo in the Movie Extra hit Small Time Gangster for which he received an ASTRA Award nomination for Most Outstanding Actor.

On film he has featured as a crazed colonel in Escape and Evasion; a cheeky cabbie in June Again; a psycho gangster in Locusts; a reclusive cattle station worker in Kriv Stender's Red Dog: True Blue; a down and out ex Rugby League star in Heath Davis' Broke; a sleazy, charismatic cult leader in Nick Matthews' One Eyed Girl; a dodgy drug dealer in Stephan Elliott's A Few Best Men; a battle hardened sergeant in Beneath Hill 60 (which earned him a Film Critics Circle of Australia Best Supporting Actor nomination 2009); a snarly stockbroker in 2008's surprise hit, Men's Group; a tall thug in Jeremy Sims’ Last Train to Freo (for which he was nominated for Best Lead Actor at both the Australian Film Institute and Film Critic's Circle Awards); a WWII digger in Kokoda; a larrikin Aussie climber in Martin Campbell's Vertical Limit; a clumsy, shotty-loving bank robber in Gregor Jordan's Two Hands; a moustachioed cop in David Caesar's Mullet; a weird-arsed beachcomber in Lost Things and an all-singing-all-dancing sailor in Disney’s remake of South Pacific.

He won the Nicole Kidman Best Actor Award at Tropfest 1996 for (his own) short film Cliché, and was also the lead actor in the Tropfest 2005 hit, Bomb.

Le Marquand has been seen on stage in Green Park, Ugly Mugs, Songket and The Return (which was the stage version of Last Train to Freo) for Griffin Theatre; Gaybies for Darlinghurst Theatre;  Enemy Of The People, Jasper Jones, Death Of A Salesman, Summer Of The Seventeenth Doll (also for MTC and QTC), Paul, The Spook, Buried Child and Waiting For Godot for Belvoir; Holy Day for the Sydney Theatre Company, Don’s Party for the Melbourne Theatre Co and STC;  and was a member of the STC's Actors' Company  where he appeared in Tales From The Vienna Woods; The Serpents Teeth; Gallipoli and The War Of The Roses (alongside Cate Blanchett) with the Company.

Le Marquand (together with Simon Bedak and Michael Neaylon) co-wrote, produced, directed and starred in a theatre production of the novel He Died with a Felafel in His Hand, which had its humble beginnings at Rozelle's Bridge Hotel in Sydney during 1995 before running for several years in Melbourne, Perth, Adelaide, Lismore, Hobart, Brisbane, Edinburgh, Toronto, New York, Wagga Wagga and Hong Kong. The stage adaptation's 'rough as guts' humour saw it become the longest running play in Australian history.

In 2019, during The Vision Splendid Outback Film Festival in Winton, Queensland, Le Marquand was honoured with a star on Winton's Walk of Fame.

External links
 
 Steve Le Marquand on TV.com

References 

Australian male film actors
Australian male stage actors
Australian male television actors
Living people
Male actors from Perth, Western Australia
Male actors from Sydney
1967 births
Western Sydney University alumni
20th-century Australian male actors
21st-century Australian male actors
People educated at Oakhill College